The National Hockey League has used the name Atlantic Division for two distinct groups of teams.

The original Atlantic Division, the predecessor of which was the Patrick Division, was formed in 1993 as part of the Eastern Conference in a league realignment.

As part of a 2013 realignment, the entirety of the former Atlantic Division was realigned into the Metropolitan Division. The Atlantic Division name was assigned to a new division comprising the entirety of the former Northeast Division plus the Florida Panthers and the Tampa Bay Lightning (coincidentally, both were members of the original Atlantic Division until 1998) from the now-dissolved Southeast Division, and the Detroit Red Wings, who moved from the Central Division of the Western Conference.

This division features a number of classic and modern NHL rivalries, including Bruins–Canadiens, Canadiens–Maple Leafs, Maple Leafs–Red Wings, Maple Leafs–Senators, and Lightning–Panthers. Games between the division's three Canadian teams, plus the Bruins and Red Wings, are frequently featured on Hockey Night in Canada as its main attraction.

Division lineups

1993–1998
 Florida Panthers
 New Jersey Devils
 New York Islanders
 New York Rangers
 Philadelphia Flyers
 Tampa Bay Lightning
 Washington Capitals

Changes from the 1992–93 season
 The Atlantic Division is formed as a result of NHL realignment
 The New Jersey Devils, New York Islanders, New York Rangers, Philadelphia Flyers, and Washington Capitals come from the Patrick Division
 The Tampa Bay Lightning come from the Norris Division
 The Florida Panthers are added as an expansion team

1998–2013
 New Jersey Devils
 New York Islanders
 New York Rangers
 Philadelphia Flyers
 Pittsburgh Penguins

Changes from the 1997–98 season
 The Florida Panthers, Tampa Bay Lightning, and Washington Capitals move to the Southeast Division
 The Pittsburgh Penguins come from the Northeast Division

2013–2020
 Boston Bruins
 Buffalo Sabres
 Detroit Red Wings
 Florida Panthers
 Montreal Canadiens
 Ottawa Senators
 Tampa Bay Lightning
 Toronto Maple Leafs

Changes from the 2012–13 season
 The Northeast and Southeast Divisions are dissolved due to NHL realignment
 The New Jersey Devils, New York Islanders, New York Rangers, Philadelphia Flyers, and Pittsburgh Penguins move to the Metropolitan Division
 The Boston Bruins, Buffalo Sabres, Montreal Canadiens, Ottawa Senators, and Toronto Maple Leafs come from the Northeast Division
 The Florida Panthers and Tampa Bay Lightning come from the Southeast Division
 The Detroit Red Wings come from the Central Division

2020–2021
 Division not used for the 2020–21 NHL season

Changes from the 2019–20 season
 Due to COVID-19 restrictions the NHL realigned into four divisions with no conferences for the 2020–21 season
 The Boston Bruins and Buffalo Sabres move to the East Division
 The Detroit Red Wings, Florida Panthers and Tampa Bay Lightning move to the Central Division
 The Montreal Canadiens, Ottawa Senators and Toronto Maple Leafs move to the North Division

2021–present
 Boston Bruins
 Buffalo Sabres
 Detroit Red Wings
 Florida Panthers
 Montreal Canadiens
 Ottawa Senators
 Tampa Bay Lightning
 Toronto Maple Leafs

Changes from the 2020–21 season
 The league returned to using a four division and two conference alignment
 The Boston Bruins and Buffalo Sabres come from the East Division
 The Detroit Red Wings, Florida Panthers and Tampa Bay Lightning come from the Central Division
 The Montreal Canadiens, Ottawa Senators and Toronto Maple Leafs come from the North Division

Division champions
 1994 – New York Rangers (52–24–8, 112 pts)
 1995 – Philadelphia Flyers (28–16–4, 60 pts)
 1996 – Philadelphia Flyers (45–24–13, 103 pts)
 1997 – New Jersey Devils (45–23–14, 104 pts)
 1998 – New Jersey Devils (48–23–11, 107 pts)
 1999 – New Jersey Devils (47–24–11, 105 pts)
 2000 – Philadelphia Flyers (45–22–12–3, 105 pts)
 2001 – New Jersey Devils (48–19–12–3, 111 pts)
 2002 – Philadelphia Flyers (42–27–10–3, 97 pts)
 2003 – New Jersey Devils (46–20–10–6, 108 pts)
 2004 – Philadelphia Flyers (40–21–15–6, 101 pts)
 2005 – no season (NHL Lockout)
 2006 – New Jersey Devils (46–27–9, 101 pts)
 2007 – New Jersey Devils (49–24–9, 107 pts)
 2008 – Pittsburgh Penguins (47–27–8, 102 pts)
 2009 – New Jersey Devils (51–27–4, 106 pts)
 2010 – New Jersey Devils (48–27–7, 103 pts)
 2011 – Philadelphia Flyers (47–23–12, 106 pts)
 2012 – New York Rangers (51–24–7, 109 pts)
 2013 – Pittsburgh Penguins (36–12–0, 72 pts)
 2014 – Boston Bruins (54–19–9, 117 pts)
 2015 – Montreal Canadiens (50–22–10, 110 pts)
 2016 – Florida Panthers (47–26–9, 103 pts)
 2017 – Montreal Canadiens (47–26–9, 103 pts)
 2018 – Tampa Bay Lightning (54–23–5, 113 pts)
 2019 – Tampa Bay Lightning (62–16–4, 128 pts)
 2020 – Boston Bruins (44–14–12, 100 pts)
 2021 – Division suspended for season
 2022 – Florida Panthers (58–18–6, 122 pts)

Season results

Notes
 The 1994–95 NHL season was shortened to 48 games due to the lockout.
 The 2012–13 NHL season was shortened to 48 games due to the lockout.
 The 2019–20 NHL season was cut short due to the COVID-19 pandemic. Due to the imbalance in the number of games played among teams, the regular season standings were determined by points percentage.

Stanley Cup winners produced
 1994 – New York Rangers
 1995 – New Jersey Devils
 2000 – New Jersey Devils
 2003 – New Jersey Devils
 2009 – Pittsburgh Penguins
 2020 – Tampa Bay Lightning

Presidents' Trophy winners produced
 1994 – New York Rangers
 2014 – Boston Bruins
 2019 – Tampa Bay Lightning
 2020 – Boston Bruins
 2022 – Florida Panthers

Atlantic Division titles won by team
Teams in bold are currently in the division.

References

NHL History

 
Atlantic Division (NHL)
National Hockey League divisions
Boston Bruins
Buffalo Sabres
Detroit Red Wings
Florida Panthers
Montreal Canadiens
Ottawa Senators
Tampa Bay Lightning
Toronto Maple Leafs